Yeiji "Lanky" Inouye (19 February 1925 – 26 June 2018) was a Canadian judoka, is one of only five Canadian judoka to achieve the rank of Kudan (9th dan), and was deeply involved in the development of judo in Canada. He was President of Judo British Columbia, Coach for the 1969 Canadian World Judo Championships team, Chairman of the National Grading Board, inducted into the Judo Canada Hall of Fame in 2001, and inducted into the Victoria Hall of Fame in 2018. Inouye co-founded the Victoria Judo Club in 1957.

See also
Judo in British Columbia
Judo in Canada
List of Canadian judoka

References

Canadian male judoka
1925 births
2018 deaths
20th-century Canadian people
21st-century Canadian people